WRSW may refer to:

 WRSW (AM), a radio station (1480 AM) licensed to Warsaw, Indiana, United States
 WRSW-FM, a radio station (107.3 FM) licensed to Warsaw, Indiana, United States